Prince Gary "Prink" Callison (August 15, 1899 – June 17, 1986) was an American football player and coach.  He served as the head coach at the University of Oregon from 1932 to 1937, compiling a record of 33–23–2. In 1933, Callison led the program to its second championship of the Pacific Coast Conference.

Early career
Callison played college football at Oregon from 1920 to 1922. He then became the head football and basketball coach at Medford High School, leading the boys' basketball team to Oregon state championships in 1924 and 1929.

Head coach at Oregon
The Ducks hired Callison in 1932. In 1933, he coached the Ducks to a 9–1 record and a tie for the Pacific Coast Conference championship with Stanford. Since the two schools did not meet head-to-head, the decision of which team would play in the Rose Bowl had to be made by the committee. They chose Stanford, on the strength of the school's victory over USC, the only team to have beaten Oregon that year.  1933 was Callison's best year as the Ducks finished no higher than fourth in the next four seasons. He resigned after the 1937 season.

Legacy and death
Callison died in Laguna Hills, California in 1986. He had been named to the Oregon Sports Hall of Fame in 1981.

Head coaching record

College

References

1899 births
1986 deaths
American football centers
Oregon Ducks football coaches
Oregon Ducks football players
High school football coaches in Oregon
High school basketball coaches in Oregon